Jacob John Smith (June 10, 1887 – November 7, 1948) was a professional baseball player. A relief pitcher, Smith appeared in two games for the Philadelphia Phillies of Major League Baseball National League during the 1911 season. He was officially listed as standing  and weighing .

Biography
Smith was born "Jacob Schmidt" on June 10, 1887, in Dravosburg, Pennsylvania.

In 1911, Smith played two games for the Philadelphia Phillies. In his two games as a pitcher, he finished both games in which he played, meaning that he completed the final inning in each. He threw a total of five innings in those contests. He faced 19 batters, of whom he struck out one and walked two. Having allowed three hits to supplement his two free passes, he amassed a WHIP ratio (walks plus hits per inning pitched) of 1.000.

As a hitter, Smith made three plate appearances in his two games. He did not collect any hits in those three times at bat, but did earn a single run batted in. While fielding on the mound, Smith had a perfect 1.000 fielding percentage, making two assists in his two fielding chances.

Smith died on November 7, 1948, across the river from his hometown in East McKeesport, Pennsylvania, at age 61. He was interred in Grandview Cemetery in McKeesport, Pennsylvania.

See also
Philadelphia Phillies all-time roster (S)
"Cup of coffee" — a short stint at the major league level of a sport
List of people from the Pittsburgh metropolitan area

References

External links

1887 births
1948 deaths
Philadelphia Phillies players
Baseball players from Pennsylvania